Sebastian Stan (born August 13, 1982) is a Romanian and American actor. He gained recognition for his role as Bucky Barnes / Winter Soldier in the Marvel Cinematic Universe media franchise beginning with the film Captain America: The First Avenger (2011), and most recently starring in the Disney+ miniseries The Falcon and the Winter Soldier (2021).

On television, Stan has played Carter Baizen in Gossip Girl, Prince Jack Benjamin in Kings, Jefferson in Once Upon a Time, and T.J. Hammond in Political Animals. The latter earned him a nomination for a Critics' Choice Television Award. In 2022, he received critical acclaim for playing Tommy Lee in the Hulu miniseries Pam & Tommy earning a nomination for a Primetime Emmy Award, a Golden Globe Award, and a Critics' Choice Award.

In films, he co-starred in Jonathan Demme's comedy-drama Ricki and the Flash, Ridley Scott's science fiction film The Martian (both 2015), and Steven Soderbergh's Logan Lucky (2017). He has since starred in the biopic I, Tonya (2017) and the thriller Fresh (2022).

Early life 
Stan was born in Constanța, Romania. His parents divorced when he was two years old. When he was eight, Stan and his mother, Georgeta Orlovschi, moved to Vienna, Austria, where she was employed as a pianist, following the Fall of Communism in 1989. Four years later, they moved to Rockland County, New York, after his mother married the headmaster of a school in the United States. He was raised in the Romanian Orthodox Church.

During Stan's years at the Rockland school, he starred in productions including Harvey, Cyrano de Bergerac, Little Shop of Horrors, Over Here!, and West Side Story. He also attended the Stagedoor Manor summer camp where he was cast in many camp productions. It was then that he decided to take acting seriously and began to apply for acting programs at several universities. He attended Rutgers University's Mason Gross School of the Arts, which gave him the opportunity to spend a year abroad studying acting at Shakespeare's Globe Theatre in London, England. He graduated from Rutgers in 2005. Stan became a United States citizen in 2002.

Career 

After an appearance in the 1994 film 71 Fragments of a Chronology of Chance, Stan's career began in earnest in 2003 with a role on Law & Order. This was followed by several film appearances, including Tony n' Tina's Wedding, The Architect, and The Covenant, before he earned a recurring role on Gossip Girl as Carter Baizen, beginning in 2007. Stan performed a lead role in the 2009 series Kings as Jack Benjamin. In 2010, he appeared in Darren Aronofsky's ballet thriller Black Swan and in the comedy Hot Tub Time Machine as antagonist Blaine. In 2011, he portrayed Bucky Barnes in the film Captain America: The First Avenger, based on the Marvel Comics character. Although it was his first film in the Marvel Cinematic Universe (MCU), it was not part of the nine-picture contract he has with Marvel Studios. Stan later said that about a month after the film was released, he struggled with paying rent.

In 2012, he starred in the thriller Gone, the supernatural horror film The Apparition, and began a recurring role in Once Upon a Time as the Mad Hatter. The A.V. Club described his work in "Hat Trick", his premiere episode, as "excellent" and placed the episode in their list of the 30 best episodes of 2012 from the series that did not make their top list. It was initially reported the role would be recast for the spin-off series Once Upon a Time in Wonderland due to Stan's commitment to the MCU, but Edward Kitsis revealed that due to fan backlash and respect for Stan's performance, the character would not be recast and the series would proceed without the character. The same year, he also appeared in the USA Network miniseries Political Animals as the troubled gay son of the former First Lady, for which he was nominated for the Critics' Choice Television Award for Best Supporting Actor in a Movie/Miniseries. In 2013, Stan played Hal Carter in the Roundabout Theater Company's production of William Inge's Picnic at the American Airlines Theater in New York.

In 2014, Stan reprised his role as Bucky Barnes, now called Winter Soldier, in the first film of his nine-movie contract, Captain America: The Winter Soldier. In 2015, he played Joshua Brummel in Ricki and the Flash, and co-starred in The Martian as NASA scientist Dr. Chris Beck and The Bronze as Lance Tucker. Stan reprised his role as the Winter Soldier in 2015's Ant-Man, by making a cameo appearance, and Captain America: Civil War in 2016. In 2017, Stan co-starred as NASCAR driver Dayton White in Steven Soderbergh's caper comedy Logan Lucky, portrayed Jeff Gillooly in Craig Gillespie's biopic I, Tonya, and starred in the drama I'm Not Here.

In 2018, Stan again portrayed Winter Soldier in both Black Panther, as an uncredited cameo, and in Avengers: Infinity War. He then appeared opposite Nicole Kidman in the thriller film Destroyer. Stan portrayed Charles Blackwood in We Have Always Lived in the Castle, an adaptation of Shirley Jackson's novel of the same name. Stan's first film of 2019 was Avengers: Endgame, released in April, for which he reprised his role as Winter Soldier. His second film of the year, Endings, Beginnings, premiered at the Toronto International Film Festival in September.

Stan starred as protagonist Scott Huffman in the Vietnam War drama film The Last Full Measure, which was released in January 2020. In addition, Stan appeared in Monday and The Chain. In February 2019, he replaced his MCU co-star Chris Evans in the drama film The Devil All the Time, which premiered on Netflix in 2020. In April 2019, Disney confirmed a Marvel television series starring Stan and Anthony Mackie, called The Falcon and the Winter Soldier, which began airing on Disney+ on March 19, 2021, and ran through April 23, 2021. In May 2019, Stan joined the cast of spy thriller The 355, which was released in 2022. Stan starred next as Tommy Lee in Hulu's biographical miniseries Pam & Tommy, for which received nomination for the Primetime Emmy Award for Outstanding Lead Actor in a Limited or Anthology Series or Movie  and in the thriller film Fresh, for which received nomination for the Critics' Choice Television Award for Best Actor in a Movie/Miniseries. In February 2023, Stan starred alongside Julianne Moore in Apple TV+ and A24's Sharper.

Philanthropic work 
Stan is a supporter of many charitable organizations, including Our Big Day Out, a nonprofit based in Romania that helps provide children with a higher quality of life. In February 2018, he thanked fans on behalf of the organization for participating in fundraising and awareness on Instagram.

He is also associated with the Ronald McDonald House. In 2020, he attended the charity's first Virtual Gala with his Marvel co-star Anthony Mackie. Other charities supported by Stan include Dramatic Need and Save the Children.

Personal life
From 2011 to 2012, Stan had an on-off relationship with actress and dancer Dianna Agron.

Filmography

Film

Television

Video games

Music videos

Awards and nominations

References

External links 

 
 
 
 

1982 births
21st-century American male actors
21st-century Romanian male actors
American male film actors
American male television actors
Living people
Male actors from New York (state)
Mason Gross School of the Arts alumni
People from Constanța
People from Rockland County, New York
Romanian emigrants to the United States
Romanian male film actors
Rutgers University alumni
Naturalized citizens of the United States